34th London Film Critics Circle Awards
2 February 2014

Film of the Year: 
12 Years a Slave

British Film of the Year: 
The Selfish Giant

The 34th London Film Critics' Circle Awards, honouring the best in film for 2013, were announced by the London Film Critics' Circle on 2 February 2014.

Winners and nominees
Winners are listed first and highlighted with boldface.

Film of the Year
12 Years a Slave
Blue Is the Warmest Colour
Blue Jasmine
Frances Ha
Gravity
The Great Beauty
Her
Inside Llewyn Davis
Nebraska
The Wolf of Wall Street

British Film of the Year
The Selfish Giant
A Field in England
Filth
Philomena
Rush

Foreign Language Film of the Year
Blue Is the Warmest Colour
Caesar Must Die
Gloria
The Great Beauty
A Hijacking

Documentary of the Year
The Act of Killing
Beware of Mr. Baker
Leviathan
Stories We Tell
We Steal Secrets: The Story of WikiLeaks

Director of the Year
Alfonso Cuarón – Gravity
Paul Greengrass – Captain Phillips
Steve McQueen – 12 Years a Slave
Paolo Sorrentino – The Great Beauty
Martin Scorsese – The Wolf of Wall Street

Screenwriter of the Year
Joel and Ethan Coen – Inside Llewyn Davis
Steve Coogan and Jeff Pope – Philomena
Spike Jonze – Her
John Ridley – 12 Years a Slave
Terence Winter – The Wolf of Wall Street

Breakthrough British Filmmaker
Jon S. Baird – Filth
Scott Graham – Shell
Marcus Markou – Papadopoulos & Sons
Rufus Norris – Broken
Paul Wright – For Those in Peril

Actor of the Year
Chiwetel Ejiofor – 12 Years a Slave
Bruce Dern – Nebraska
Leonardo DiCaprio – The Wolf of Wall Street
Michael Douglas – Behind the Candelabra
Tom Hanks – Captain Phillips

Actress of the Year
Cate Blanchett – Blue Jasmine
Sandra Bullock – Gravity
Judi Dench – Philomena
Adèle Exarchopoulos – Blue Is the Warmest Colour
Greta Gerwig – Frances Ha

Supporting Actor of the Year
Barkhad Abdi – Captain Phillips
Michael Fassbender – 12 Years a Slave
James Gandolfini – Enough Said
Tom Hanks – Saving Mr. Banks
Jared Leto – Dallas Buyers Club

Supporting Actress of the Year
Lupita Nyong'o – 12 Years a Slave
Naomie Harris – Mandela: Long Walk to Freedom
Sally Hawkins – Blue Jasmine
Jennifer Lawrence – American Hustle
June Squibb – Nebraska

British Actor of the Year
James McAvoy – Filth, Trance, and Welcome to the Punch
Christian Bale – American Hustle and Out of the Furnace
Steve Coogan – Alan Partridge: Alpha Papa, The Look of Love, Philomena, and What Maisie Knew
Chiwetel Ejiofor – 12 Years a Slave
Michael Fassbender – The Counselor and 12 Years a Slave

British Actress of the Year
Judi Dench – Philomena
Lindsay Duncan – About Time, Last Passenger, and Le Week-End
Naomie Harris – Mandela: Long Walk to Freedom
Sally Hawkins – Blue Jasmine
Emma Thompson – Beautiful Creatures and Saving Mr. Banks

Young British Performer of the Year
Conner Chapman – The Selfish Giant
Saoirse Ronan – Byzantium, The Host, and How I Live Now
Eloise Laurence – Broken
George MacKay – Breakfast with Jonny Wilkinson, For Those in Peril, How I Live Now, and Sunshine on Leith
Shaun Thomas – The Selfish Giant

Technical Achievement
Gravity – Tim Webber, visual effects
12 Years a Slave – Sean Bobbitt, cinematography
American Hustle – Judy Becker, production design
Behind the Candelabra – Howard Cummings, production design
Filth – Mark Eckersley, editing
Frances Ha – Sam Levy, cinematography
The Hunger Games: Catching Fire – Trish Summerville, costumes
Inside Llewyn Davis – T-Bone Burnett, music
Stoker – Kurt Swanson and Bart Mueller, costumes
Upstream Color – Johnny Marshall, sound design

Dilys Powell Award 
Gary Oldman

References

2
2013 film awards
2013 in British cinema
2013 in London